Salve H. Matheson (11 August 1920 – 8 January 2005) was a general officer in the United States Army who served in World War II, the Korean War, and the Vietnam War.

Early life and education
Salve H. Matheson was born on 11 August 1920 to S. E. Matheson and Elsa Matheson in Seattle, Washington; he was the second of four children. Shortly after Salve's birth, the Matheson Family moved to the Monterey Peninsula where Matheson grew up and attended school. Matheson was commissioned in 1942 through the Reserve Officers' Training Corps program at the University of California, Los Angeles, of which he was a 1942 graduate with a Bachelor of Arts degree in Liberal Arts.

Military career
Matheson served in the 506th Parachute Infantry Regiment in the U.S. and in Europe during World War II. The regiment gained later international recognition following the publication of Stephen Ambrose's book Band of Brothers. Major Richard "Dick" Winters, who was celebrated in the Tom Hanks-produced HBO miniseries based on Ambrose's book, said of Salve Matheson, "No veteran who served in Easy Company had a more distinguished military career."

Matheson began his assignment with the regiment in E Company as a platoon leader and was soon moved to the 2nd Battalion staff. He was transferred to the regimental staff before the D-Day invasions. Several days after drop, Matheson was wounded by German mortar fire while organizing a machine gun assault in French hedgerows on June 13, 1944. On June 15 he was awarded the Combat Infantryman Badge. After recovering from his injuries he parachuted into Holland and was later awarded the Bronze Service Arrowhead for participating in Operation Market Garden.  Matheson was besieged with the rest of the 101st Airborne under the command of Maj. Gen. Anthony McAuliffe at Bastogne. During the Battle of the Bulge he was assigned as the S-4 of the 506th PIR and attempted without success to find small arms ammunition for his unit. Matheson served as the regimental logistics officer until March 1945, when he was moved to the position of Operations officer. Lt. Matheson helped lead the vanguard of the 101st toward Berchtesgarden and secured the surrenders of General Hans Speidel and Field Marshall Albert Kesselring.

In 1949, Harry W. O. Kinnard, then a lieutenant colonel, and Matheson, then a major, served as technical advisers on the movie Battleground.

During the Korean War, Matheson was assigned to the 18th Airborne Corps and the 1st Infantry Division. He was involved in amphibious landings at Inchon, South Korea and Wonsan, North Korea and in the amphibious withdrawal from Hungnam, North Korea. In early 1951, Matheson, then a major, was awarded the third oak leaf cluster to his Bronze Star by Headquarters, X Corps, after he had been reassigned to Washington, D.C.

In January 1954, Matheson, a lieutenant colonel, was assigned as assistant chief of staff, G3 of the 1st Infantry Division in U.S. Army, Europe (USAREUR); he had previously been assigned to the research and development division of USAREUR. He was reassigned from the 1st Infantry Division in September 1955.

During the height of the Cold War, Matheson commanded the 10th Special Forces Group (Airborne), Bad Tölz, Federal Republic of Germany, from 1961 to 1963.

In December 1965, Matheson was selected for promotion to brigadier general. In mid-April 1966, Matheson, still a colonel, who had previously been assigned to the Office of the Joint Chiefs of Staff, assumed duty as the 101st Airborne Division's assistant commander for supporting units at Fort Campbell, Kentucky. Matheson became the commander of the 1st Brigade, 101st Airborne Division in March 1966. From late January 1967 to 1968, Matheson, who came to be known by his men as "The Iron Duke," commanded the 1st Brigade, 101st Airborne Division. He commanded extensive "search and destroy" operations against the Viet Cong and North Vietnamese Army Regulars, including Operation Hood River. He established a camp near Duc Pho, Republic of Vietnam, which he named CARENTAN. In January 1968, he was assigned as the Senior U.S. Army adviser to the I Corps Tactical Zone

In April 1968, Matheson assumed duties as Director, ROTC-National Defense Cadet Corps at Fort Monroe, Virginia after leaving his command of the 1st Brigade, 101st Airborne Division in Vietnam. In July 1968, Matheson was selected for promotion to major general. In 1968, he assumed command of the 101st Airborne Division.

In the fall of 1970, Matheson was reassigned from his position as Commander, 2nd Infantry Division in South Korea to the Inter-American Defense Board in Washington, D.C.

Military awards
Matheson's decorations include the Army Distinguished Service Medal with Oak Leaf Cluster, the Silver Star, the Legion of Merit, the Distinguished Flying Cross, four Bronze Star Medals, twelve Air Medals, the Army Commendation Medal, the Purple Heart, Master Parachutist Badge, and Combat Infantry Badge. Foreign awards include the Bronze Lion and the Orange Lanyard of the Netherlands.

Family
Matheson's engagement to Patricia Halloran was announced by her parents, Colonel and Mrs. Michael E. Halloran, on 20 September 1947. They married later that year and honeymooned in Carmel, California. They had three children. Matheson's older brother, Martin "Big Whitey" Matheson was a lieutenant in the U.S. Army and a stunt man in Hollywood who acted as Ward Bond's stunt double.

Later life and death
After retiring from the Army in 1975, Matheson and his wife Patricia retired to Carmel, California. He died on 8 January 2005 in Monterey, California, survived by his wife and three children. He was buried at Arlington National Cemetery with his spouse, Patricia H.

References

Further reading
 
 BS/3OLC
 

1920 births
2005 deaths
United States Army generals
United States Army personnel of World War II
United States Army personnel of the Korean War
United States Army personnel of the Vietnam War
Band of Brothers characters
University of California alumni
Recipients of the Distinguished Service Medal (US Army)
Burials at Arlington National Cemetery

Military personnel from Washington (state)